Julie Greifer Swidler is an American attorney and music industry executive.

Career 
Swidler is the executive vice president and general counsel of Sony Music Entertainment, a position she has held since 2008.

Swidler is on the Recording Academy task force on diversity and inclusion, which examines barriers and biases affecting women and other underrepresented voices in the music industry. She is a member of the board of directors of the RIAA, the UJA-Federation of New York's Music for Youth initiative, and the TJ Martell Foundation. She was the first woman to receive the Grammy Foundation Entertainment Law Initiative Service Award.

Honors 

Swidler is a 2016 recipient of the Grammy Foundation's ELI Service Award. Swidler received the Lifetime Music Industry Award from the T.J. Martell Foundation in 2017.

In 2020, Swidler was honored with The Presidential Award by the Music Business Association. She appeared on the Billboard Power List in 2020, 2021, and 2022.

References

Year of birth missing (living people)
Living people
American music industry executives
American women lawyers
21st-century American women